Limehouse was a borough constituency centred on the Limehouse district of the East End of London.  It returned one Member of Parliament (MP) to the House of Commons of the Parliament of the United Kingdom.

History 
The constituency was created by the Redistribution of Seats Act 1885 for the 1885 general election, and abolished for the 1950 general election.

Its most prominent MP was Labour's Clement Attlee, party leader from 1935 to 1955, and Prime Minister from 1945 to 1951.

Boundaries

In 1885 the area was administered as part of the county of Middlesex. It was located in the Tower division, in the east of the historic county. The neighbourhood of Limehouse formed a division of the parliamentary borough of Tower Hamlets. The parliamentary division was part of the East End of London.

In 1889 the Tower division of Middlesex was severed from the county, for administrative purposes. It became part of the County of London. In 1900 the lower tier of local government in London was re-modelled. Limehouse became part of the Metropolitan Borough of Stepney.

When a re-distribution of parliamentary seats took place in 1918, the constituency became a division of Stepney. It comprised the wards of Limehouse North, Limehouse South, Mile End Old Town North East, Mile End Old Town South East, and Ratcliffe.

Members of Parliament

Election results

Elections in the 1880s

Elections in the 1890s

Elections in the 1900s (decade)

Elections in the 1910s

Elections in the 1920s

Elections in the 1930s

Elections in the 1940s

References 

 Boundaries of Parliamentary Constituencies 1885-1972, compiled and edited by F.W.S. Craig (Parliamentary Reference Publications 1972)

Politics of the London Borough of Tower Hamlets
Parliamentary constituencies in London (historic)
Constituencies of the Parliament of the United Kingdom established in 1885
Constituencies of the Parliament of the United Kingdom disestablished in 1950
Constituencies of the Parliament of the United Kingdom represented by a sitting Prime Minister
Limehouse